Golden Era may refer to:

The Golden Era, a 19th-century San Francisco newspaper
Golden Era Building, a historic building in San Francisco, that once housed the newspaper of the same name
Golden Era (Del the Funky Homosapien album)
Golden Era (Rita Redshoes album)
Golden Era Productions, an organization operated by the Church of Scientology
Golden Era Records, an Australian record label
The Golden Era (film)
Sino-British relations, often referred to as a "Golden Era" in the current time.

See also
Golden Age (disambiguation)
Golden Years (disambiguation)